Pekerman may refer to:

People
José Pekerman, Argentine football coach and an ex-football player.
 Nina Pekerman, Israeli triathlete